Agente Segreto 070: Thunderbay Missione Grasshopper is a 1966 Italian spy film directed by Burton van Hooven, a possible alias of Cesare Canevari. It is a spoof of James Bond's Thunderball and a sequel to Un tango dalla Russia (1965) with Dan Christian repeating his role as Agente 070.

Cast
Dan Christian  ... Dan Cooper, Agente 070
Vasna Welsh ...  Secret Agent
 ...  Sergeant Bear, Scotland Yard (as Bob Messenger) 
Mills Mason ...  Paco 
Ursula Kent... Rossabella 
Lolita Ritz... Regina

External links
 

1966 films
1960s Italian-language films
1960s action comedy films
Italian spy comedy films
Italian parody films
1960s parody films
Films directed by Cesare Canevari
1960s spy comedy films
Italian action comedy films
1960s Italian films